The Engadine Open was a golf tournament in Switzerland from 1962 to the late 1960s. The event was played at Engadine Golf Club near St. Moritz, Switzerland. As of the last tournament, it was a par 70 measuring 6,545 yards.

Winners

References 

Golf tournaments in Switzerland
Recurring sporting events established in 1962
1962 establishments in Switzerland